Wrestling (Turkish: güreş) is considered as an "ancestral sport" in Turkey,  represented foremost by the annual Kırkpınar tournament in oil wrestling.

Along with various highly esteemed styles of folk wrestling (known colloquially as çayır güreşi, or "meadow wrestling", because bouts are held on grass fields), olympic wrestling (known colloquially as minder güreşi, or "mat wrestling") is widely practiced, while Greco-Roman wrestling is less popular due to freestyle wrestling's technical affinity with folk wrestling.

Turkey currently has only one professional wrestling promotion, Turkish Power Wrestling founded in 2010.

Turkish folk wrestling styles
Styles practised nationwide (sanctioned by the Turkish Wrestling Federation):
Karakucak Güreşi
Oil wrestling (Turkish: Yağlı Güreş )
Styles practised locally (sanctioned by the Turkey Traditional Sport Branches Federation):
Aba Güreşi (jacket wrestling) (in Hatay)
Aşırtmalı Aba Güreşi (belt wrestling) (in Gaziantep, Adana, Osmaniye)
Kısa Şalvar Güreşi (in Kahramanmaraş)
Kuşak Güreşi or Tatar Güreşi
Kar üstü Karakucak Güreşi 
Şalvar Güreşi
Torun Abası
Siyah Aba
Boz Aba
Kırmızı Aba
Maraş Abası
Urfa Abası
Çuha Abası
Hamis Abası

Sport wrestling
FILA Wrestling World Championships were held in Turkey in
1957, 1974, 1994, 1999 and  2011.
The Turkish team won  the Men's freestyle championship in 1951, 1954, 1957, 1966 and 1994; and the Men's Greco-Roman championship in 2006 and 2009.

References

External links
The World Ethnosport Confederation (WEC)
Ata Sporu Güreş
Greko-romen güreşi biliyor musunuz?
Türkiye Güreş Federasyonu - Yağlı Güreş
Türkiye Güreş Federasyonu - Karakucak